Gerold Jungwirth (born 20 July 1947) is an Austrian judoka. He competed in the men's half-middleweight event at the 1972 Summer Olympics.

References

1947 births
Living people
Austrian male judoka
Olympic judoka of Austria
Judoka at the 1972 Summer Olympics
Place of birth missing (living people)
20th-century Austrian people